Secca de bœuf or Secca d'Entrevaux is a type of dried salted beef made in Entrevaux. Similar to the Swiss Bündnerfleisch, it is typically eaten as a starter, thinly sliced and served with virgin olive oil, lemon juice, and sliced tomatoes.

See also

 List of dried foods

French cuisine
Beef
Dried meat